A by-election was held for the Australian House of Representatives seat of Parramatta on 20 June 1964. This was triggered by the resignation of Liberal MP and Attorney-General Sir Garfield Barwick to become Chief Justice of the High Court. A by-election for the seat of Angas was held on the same day.

The by-election was won by Liberal candidate Nigel Bowen.

Results

References

1964 elections in Australia
New South Wales federal by-elections
June 1964 events in Australia